Hemerocallis coreana is a species of plant in the family Asphodelaceae. It is native to  China, southwestern Korea and southern Japan.

References

coreana
Flora of China
Flora of Eastern Asia
Plants described in 1932